Gbendembu Ngowahun is a chiefdom of Bombali District in the Northern Province of Sierra Leone. The principal towns are Gbendembu and Kalangba.

As of 2004 the chiefdom has a population of 29,971.

References

Chiefdoms of Sierra Leone
Northern Province, Sierra Leone